Being Bobby Brown is an American reality television series that debuted on Bravo on June 30, 2005.

Premise
The series depicts the life of R&B singer Bobby Brown, his then-wife, pop/R&B superstar Whitney Houston, and their family. The program showcases the family's home time, along with shopping at the famed Harrod's of London (where they met with the owner Mohamed Al-Fayed), and vacationing in the Bahamas.

The program ran on Thursdays, but on occasion aired several times through the week. The series was extremely popular throughout its run and received the highest ratings ever for the Bravo network. The show also continued Houston's unbroken string of hit motion pictures and television projects. The highly rated show ran for only one season and ended after Houston stated she would not appear in a second season; thus, Bravo and Brown could not reach an agreement to continue the show.

Episodes

Home media
A spokesperson for Bravo has told various news outlets that the series will be kept in the Bravo archives.

In popular culture
Houston popularized the phrase "Hell to the no" on the series and was nominated for a VH-1 "Big In '05 Award" for "Quote of the Year". This phrase also appeared on T-shirts. The Soup television series also featured Houston loudly shouting "Kiss my ass!" as a running gag, naming it its "Clip of the Year".

Reception
Entertainment Weekly gave the series a good review with a grade of "B" and commented on how relaxed the couple is with each other and the cameras filming their every move.

One reviewer, Barry Garron, however, wrote that Being Bobby Brown', the reality show spotlighting the R&B singer whose rap sheet might be longer than his catalog, is undoubtedly the most disgusting and execrable series ever to ooze its way onto television." Garron also noted that the show contained remarks regarding sexual and excretory functions.

Despite the so-called train-wreck nature of the show, the series was extremely popular, winning its time slot, and gave Bravo its highest ratings ever.

References

External links
 

2000s American reality television series
2005 American television series debuts
2005 American television series endings
African-American reality television series
English-language television shows
Bravo (American TV network) original programming
Whitney Houston